V. K. Ramaswami Mudaliar was an Indian politician and former Opposition Leader of the Member of the Legislative Assembly of Tamil Nadu. He was elected to the Tamil Nadu legislative assembly from Uthiramerur constituency as an Indian National Congress candidate in 1952 election, and as an Independent candidate in 1957 election. He set up Madras labour union along with B.P.Wadia.

References 

Members of the Tamil Nadu Legislative Assembly
Indian National Congress politicians from Tamil Nadu
Living people
Year of birth missing (living people)